Albert Harding (21 April 1918 – 1989) was a Trinidadian cricketer. He played in one first-class match for Trinidad and Tobago in 1945/46.

See also
 List of Trinidadian representative cricketers

References

External links
 

1918 births
1989 deaths
Trinidad and Tobago cricketers